The Wolseley is a restaurant located at 160 Piccadilly in London, England, next to the Ritz Hotel. Designed by the architect William Curtis Green, the Grade II* listed building was erected by Wolseley Motors in 1921 as their regional offices with a ground floor showroom. The ground floor was occupied by a branch of Barclays Bank between 1927 and 1999. It was a Chinese restaurant for a couple of years then reopened in 2003 as an upscale European restaurant after renovation by British restaurateurs Chris Corbin and Jeremy King.

History

Wolseley Motors showroom
The six-storey building was commissioned by Wolseley Motors, a part of the Vickers engineering combine, which bought the site in 1919 for a car showroom and London sales offices. It was designed by the English architect William Curtis Green, drawing inspiration from a recently constructed bank building that he had seen in Boston, Massachusetts. The building, which opened in November 1921, features Venetian and Florentine-inspired detailing, with an interior decorated with lavish marble pillars and archways. Wolseley Motors lost its long-term leadership of the British car industry in the early 1920s and fell into receivership in 1926; the Wolseley showroom was sold in June 1926.

Barclays Bank branch
The premises were acquired by Barclays Bank, and re-opened in April 1927 as 160 Piccadilly Branch. Barclays re-employed William Curtis Green to create offices and a banking counter, and design furniture in Japanese lacquer. Barclays sold it in 1999 and opened in new smaller offices in nearby St James's Street.

Restaurant
After the closure of the Barclays branch in 1999, the premises were refurbished and initially turned into a Chinese restaurant ("The Orient at China House") until the building was purchased in July 2003 by the restaurateurs Chris Corbin and Jeremy King, who began a major restoration and renovation project, though they retained many of the original features. The Wolseley opened in November 2003, operating as an all-day café in the "Grand European" style. It has since received numerous accolades, including Harper & Moet's Restaurant of the Year 2004, The Observer's Best Breakfast 2005 and 2009, Tatler's Restaurant of the Year 2007 and Zagat's Favourite Restaurant 2012 and 2013.

The Wolseley has consistently been among London's most profitable restaurants, recording sales of over £10 million in 2007 alone.

Ownership 
Corbin & King is the owner of The Wolseley, the company is in turn owned by Minor Hotels. Jeremy King is the co-founder of Corbin & King (C&K). The winning auction bid by Minor Hotels was £60 million ($78.8m), resulting in end of Jeremy King's ownership.

Architecture and decoration
When the building opened in 1921, elevations to both Arlington Street and Piccadilly were faced with Portland stone. Wolseley's car showroom occupied the entire ground floor. The interior walls were of polished Portland stone with blue York stone dressings, and the floor laid with white and black marble in intricate geometric designs, which remain today. The ceiling consisted of nine domes supported by Doric columns finished in red Japanese lacquer. Red, black and gold lacquer were also used on the doors, screens and wall panels. Lighting was provided by elaborate bronze pendants and concealed lamps which threw their rays into the domes to be reflected to the floor.  Apart from covering the red lacquer columns with a black wrapping, the present interior remains very close to the original designs of William Curtis Green.

References

Further reading

Restaurants in London
Grade II* listed buildings in the City of Westminster
Tourist attractions in the City of Westminster
Restaurants established in 2003
Buildings and structures completed in 1921
2003 establishments in England